The Cayman Islands competed at the 1984 Summer Olympics in Los Angeles, United States.  The nation returned to the Olympic Games after participating in the American-led boycott of the 1980 Summer Olympics. Eight competitors, seven men and one woman, took part in seven events in two sports.

Cycling

Men's individual road race
 David Dibben — did not finish (→ no ranking) 
 Alfred Ebanks — did not finish (→ no ranking) 
 Craig Merren — did not finish (→ no ranking)
 Aldyn Wint — did not finish (→ no ranking)

Team time trial
 David Dibben
 Alfred Ebanks
 Craig Merren
 Aldyn Wint

Sprint
 Ernest Moodie

1000m time trial
 Ernest Moodie

Points race
 Ernest Moodie

Women's individual road race
 Merilyn Phillips — did not finish (→ no ranking) Merilyn is the sister of Craig Merren. She was the first woman cyclist and Olympian for the Cayman Islands.

Sailing

References

External links
Official Olympic Reports

Nations at the 1984 Summer Olympics
1984
Olympics